Biker subculture may refer to:

 Motorcycling subculture, chiefly British English
 Outlaw motorcycle clubs in US English
 Bicycle culture

See also
 Biker (disambiguation)